The 1959–60 season saw Rochdale compete for their first season in the Football League Fourth Division, following relegation the previous season.

Statistics

|}

Final League Table

Competitions

Football League Fourth Division

F.A. Cup

Lancashire Cup

References

Rochdale A.F.C. seasons
Rochdale